Red Line is a 1996 American action film directed by John Sjogren and written by him, Rolfe Kanefsky, and Scott Ziehl. It stars Chad McQueen, Dom DeLuise, Michael Madsen, Roxana Zal, Jan-Michael Vincent, and Corey Feldman.

Immediately prior to filming, Jan-Michael Vincent was in a severe car accident that left his face badly scarred. He can be seen still wearing his hospital ID wrist bracelet in the movie. It was written into the script that Vincent's character had been in a car accident, and he needed new shocks from McQueen's character, a mechanic.

Plot
Jim is a car mechanic who is drawn into danger after he robs a convenience store while driving a client's bulletproof car. He returns the car to the client, Keller, who demands that he bring him a Ferrari held by a couple in the mountains. Jim also meets a young woman, Gem, who he tries to impress. He's successful in bringing Keller the car, only for him to order Jim to bring him a Ferrari and then a Corvette. He manages to acquire the cars, but with great difficulty and collateral damage. While acquiring the Corvette Jim is confronted and threatened with death, but also manages to save Gem from an abusive boyfriend. He is also pursued by a man called Mr. Lawrence, who wants the diamonds hidden in the Corvette.

Ultimately Jim manages to bring Keller the Corvette, which is now demolished from all of the action and from having exploded due to an accident. Keller orders him to leave, which Jim does, taking the burned Corvette to fix it. Just as he's leaving, Mr. Lawrence and Keller, as well as their men, open fire on each other.  Meanwhile, Jim and Gem board a bus and leave town and Gem asked Jim, what happened to Keller and he doesn't know.

Cast
 Chad McQueen as Jim
 Dom DeLuise as Jerry
 Michael Madsen as Mr. Lawrence
 Roxana Zal as "Gem"
 Jan-Michael Vincent as Keller
 Corey Feldman as Tony
 Robert Z'Dar as Gene
 Julie Strain as Crystal
 Billy Million as Frank
 Chuck Zito as Dick

The film also includes small roles and cameos by Joe Estevez and Ron Jeremy.

Production 
While filming Sjogren suggested that Zito's character urinate on himself after fighting with McQueen's character Jim. Zito refused and suggested a different action, which met with the director's approval.

Reception 
The Austin Chronicle reviewed the film, stating that "All told, this is one entertainingly brainless mess of a Nineties B-movie." TV Guide panned Red Line, writing "McQueen (son of Steve McQueen) and Madsen both breeze through their parts with a minimum of expression, while Zal jettisons any viewer sympathy when she casually abandons her best girlfriend to an uncertain fate at Keller's hands. She and McQueen are nonetheless heroes-by-default in the pointless script."

References

External links
 

1996 films
1996 action thriller films
American action thriller films
Films about automobiles
1990s English-language films
1990s American films